Dongdaemun station is a station on Line 1 and Line 4 of the Seoul Metropolitan Subway. Sometimes called Dong Station, it is named after one of the Four Great Gates of the circular wall surrounding ancient Seoul, and is situated on the eastern end of Jongno ("Bell Street"). This station is also close to Dongdaemun Market.

In December 2010 the station is recorded as having the third highest WiFi data consumption of all the Seoul Metropolitan Subway stations, following Express Bus Terminal station, Sadang station, and followed by Jamsil station and Jongno 3(sam)-ga station.

Station layout

Vicinity
 Changsin-dong Toy Wholesale Market - the largest toy and stationery market in Korea since 1975
 Seoul City Wall Museum

References 

Seoul Metropolitan Subway stations
Metro stations in Jongno District
Railway stations opened in 1974